Olim means immigrants on aliyah to Israel.

Olim L'Berlin is a snowclone of that notion, used as protest against high consumer prices in Israel.

Olim may also refer to:
 Olim (botany)
 "Olim" is a song from the 1999 musical Der Glöckner von Notre Dame (The Hunchback of Notre Dame). "Olim" is the Latin language version of the song "Someday."

People with the name
Luís Olim (born 1981), Portuguese professional footballer
Jason Olim, CEO and a co-founder of Freshman Fund
Olim Navkarov (born  1983), Uzbekistani footballer 
Olim Kamalov, Tajik artist

See also
Mr Olim, a novel by Ernest Raymond